My Kind of Jazz Part 3 is a 1975 album by Ray Charles released by Crossover Records. Concord Records re-issued the contents in digital form in 2009.

Track listing
 "I'm Gonna Go Fishin'" (Duke Ellington) – 5:32
 "For Her" (Alf Clausen) – 6:18
 "Sister Sadie" (Horace Silver) – 4:07
 "3/4 of the Time" (Roger Neumann) – 2:50
 "Ray Minor Ray" (Benny Golson) – 3:47
 "Samba de Elencia" (Alf Clausen) – 4:39
 "Metamorphosis" (Roger Neumann) – 4:12
 "Nothing Wrong" (Charlie Mariano) – 3:32
 "Project 'S'" (Jimmy Heath) – 3:16

References
 Crossover CR 9007
 My Kind of Jazz Part 3 at [ Allmusic.com]

1975 albums
Ray Charles albums
Albums produced by Ray Charles
Jazz albums by American artists